Richard John Cherry (born February 28, 1937) is a Canadian former professional ice hockey defenceman who played in the National Hockey League (NHL) for the Boston Bruins and Philadelphia Flyers between 1956 and 1970. He is the brother of media personality Don Cherry.

Playing career
Born in Kingston, Ontario, Cherry played junior hockey for the Barrie Flyers, then professional hockey for the Boston Bruins for the 1956–57 season. After one season, Cherry played for various minor league teams, including two seasons for the Kingston Frontenacs of the Eastern Professional Hockey League. Cherry retired in 1963 to teach high school in Kingston. In the 1968–69 season, Cherry returned to the NHL to play for the Philadelphia Flyers, where he remained for two years. He played 145 NHL games in total; six with the Boston Bruins and 139 with the Philadelphia Flyers.

Career statistics

Regular season and playoffs

External links
 

1937 births
Living people
Barrie Flyers players
Boston Bruins players
Canadian educators
Canadian expatriate ice hockey players in the United States
Canadian ice hockey defencemen
Canadian people of Cornish descent
Ice hockey people from Ontario
Kingston Frontenacs (EPHL) players
Oklahoma City Blazers (1965–1977) players
Ontario Hockey Association Senior A League (1890–1979) players
Philadelphia Flyers players
Providence Reds players
Quebec Aces (QSHL) players
St. Louis Blues scouts
Sportspeople from Kingston, Ontario
Springfield Indians players